Annie Driscoll (born August 30, 1978) is an American speed skater. She competed in two events at the 2002 Winter Olympics.

References

External links
 

1978 births
Living people
American female speed skaters
Olympic speed skaters of the United States
Speed skaters at the 2002 Winter Olympics
Speed skaters from Saint Paul, Minnesota
21st-century American women